Madeleine Sologne (12 October 1912 – 31 March 1995) was a French film actress.

Sologne was born Madeleine Simone Vouillon in La Ferté-Imbault, Loir-et-Cher. She was married to the art director Jean Douarinou.

Selected filmography
 Adrienne Lecouvreur (1938)
 Raphaël le tatoué (1939)
 The Blue Danube (1940)
  (1942)
 The Eternal Return (1943)
 The Wolf of the Malveneurs (1943)
 Mademoiselle X (1945)
 Devil and the Angel (1946)
 Under the Cards (1948)
 Bernadette of Lourdes (1960)

Bibliography
 Crisp, C.G. The classic French cinema, 1930-1960. Indiana University Press, 1993 
 Durgnat, Raymond. Jean Renoir. University of California Press, 1974.

External links

Biography with photographs

1912 births
1995 deaths
French film actresses
People from Loir-et-Cher
20th-century French actresses